Grażyna Długołęcka (born 25 August 1951 in Łódź) is a Polish film actress. She is best known for her performance as Ewa Pobratynska in The Story of Sin.

References

External links

1951 births
20th-century Polish actresses
Actors from Łódź
Living people
Polish film actresses